Keystone State Park is an Oklahoma state park near Sand Springs, Tulsa County, Oklahoma, in the United States. Cabins are available to rent. Keystone State Park is on State Highway 151 near Mannford.

Fees
To help fund a backlog of deferred maintenance and park improvements, the state implemented an entrance fee for this park and 21 others effective June 15, 2020.  The fees, charged per vehicle, start at $10 per day for a single-day or $8 for residents with an Oklahoma license plate or Oklahoma tribal plate.  Fees are waived for honorably discharged veterans and Oklahoma residents age 62 & older and their spouses.  Passes good for three days or a week are also available; annual passes good at all 22 state parks charging fees are offered at a cost of $75 for out-of-state visitors or $60 for Oklahoma residents.

References

State parks of Oklahoma
Protected areas of Creek County, Oklahoma
Protected areas of Tulsa County, Oklahoma